TUI fly Belgium, legally incorporated as TUI Airlines Belgium nv and formerly branded Jetairfly, is a Belgian scheduled and charter airline with its registered office at Brussels Airport.

The airline is a subsidiary of the TUI Group and part of the TUI Airlines. TUI Airlines also incorporates the sister companies TUI fly Netherlands, Corsair International (France), TUI fly Deutschland (Germany), TUI Airways (United Kingdom) and TUI fly Nordic (Sweden).

History

The airline was established as Sunrise in 2002 as a home carrier for tour operator Jetair, part of the tourism group TUI AG and re-established as TUI Airlines Belgium on 13 November 2003. The original plans were to operate two aircraft, but after charter company Sobelair (home carrier for Jetair) ceased its operations, started its operations with 5 Boeing 737-400. On 23 November 2005, the airline was renamed Jetairfly as part of the rebranding around Belgium's number 1 tourism trade name Jetair.

In January 2012, Jetairfly announced that Jet4you, a low-cost Moroccan carrier and also a subsidiary of the TUI AG Group, would be fully integrated in Jetairfly. The merger was complete in April 2012. 
In March 2012, Jetairfly officially became a full scheduled airline, while previously a part of their flights were conducted as charter flights. As a result, all flights can be booked in both directions even by non-EU citizens.

In the beginning of 2013, Jetairfly was the first leisure airline worldwide to introduce the Embraer 190 in its fleet. In the autumn of 2013, the new office building and maintenance hangar "Jetairport" was inaugurated at Brussels Airport. In December 2013, Jetairfly was the first and only Belgian airline to introduce the brand new Boeing 787 Dreamliner.

On 14 November 2014, Jetairfly sealed a wet-lease deal to provide up to four aircraft with crew to operate on behalf of ECAir, the flag carrier of the Republic of the Congo, from mid-2015 on.

In 2015, it was the first and only Belgian airline with an ISO 14001 certification for their focus on sustainability and the smallest ecological footprint.

On 13 May 2015, it was announced by the TUI Group that all five of TUI's airline subsidiaries will be named TUI fly, whilst keeping their separate Air Operator's Certificate, taking over three years to complete. On 19 October 2016, Jetairfly received the new brand name TUI fly Belgium with the legal name still being TUI Airlines Belgium NV as the second airline within the TUI group which underwent the name change.

Destinations

TUI fly Belgium has a network of 180 routes to more than 100 airports in the Mediterranean, Red Sea, Caribbean, Canary Islands, Cape Verde Islands, Africa and the United States. The airline's home base is Brussels Airport, but flights are also operated from eight other bases: Brussels South Charleroi Airport, Liege Airport, Ostend-Bruges International Airport, Antwerp Airport, Lille Airport in France, Mohammed V International Airport Casablanca and Marrakesh Menara Airport in Morocco.

Fleet

Current fleet

The TUI fly Belgium fleet includes the following aircraft, as of December 2022:

Fleet modernisation
TUI Group has 70 737 MAXs on order for the group. The order consists of 18 MAX 10 aircraft, with the remaining variants unspecified as of June 2017. In 2018 TUI fly Belgium was set to receive a total of four new MAX aircraft. Over the next four years they were scheduled to receive a total of 15 Boeing 737 MAX 8 and four Boeing 737 MAX 10 aircraft. Deliveries of the new aircraft to the TUI Group commenced in January 2018 with the first aircraft, a Boeing 737 MAX 8, delivered to TUI fly Belgium.

Former fleet
TUI fly Belgium formerly operated the following aircraft:

Service

Short- and medium-haul
On short-and medium haul flights, there are three types of service offered on all Economy Class aircraft:

Economy Class with buy on board service offering snacks and drinks for purchase.
Economy Class with standard service, including catering.
Economy Class with Service Plus/VIP Selection, offering premium meals, free alcohol, newspapers. Access to the VIP lounge at Brussels-Zaventem Airport, with separate check-in and security fast lane.

Long-haul
Boeing 767 
Economy Class with standard service including catering.
Comfort Class with lounge access and security fast lane at Brussels-Zaventem Airport, premium meals including free alcohol, newspapers, extra legroom and amenity kits.

Boeing 787
Economy Class with standard service including catering.
Economy+ Class with extra legroom and enhanced standard services.
Premium Club with lounge access and security fast lane at Brussels-Zaventem Airport, premium meals including free alcohol, newspapers, extra-legroom seats and amenity kits.

On all long-haul flights there is AVOD for every passenger.

See also
 List of airlines of Belgium

References

External links

Official website

Airlines of Belgium
Airlines established in 2003
Charter airlines
TUI Group
Companies based in Flemish Brabant
Belgian companies established in 2003